Siasau "Sal" Aunese (May 8, 1968 – September 23, 1989) was a college football player who played for the University of Colorado.  Aunese was from Oceanside, California in San Diego County and was of Samoan  He died at age 21 from stomach cancer.

Early life
Born in Oceanside in northern San Diego County, Aunese was raised there with his six siblings.  His parents spoke Samoan at home growing up.  He was an All-American Quarterback at Vista High School, where he and his teammates won not only the C.I.F. San Diego section championship, but also the state championship.  He attracted interest from several college programs including the University of Nebraska and the University of Colorado.

Aunese's final high school transcript and his low ACT scores caused him to fall under the 1983 Convention Proposal No. 48, commonly referred to as Proposition 48.  Because of this provision, he missed the freshman year of his college career.

College career
Aunese chose Colorado after heavy recruiting from assistant coach Les Miles and head coach Bill McCartney.  Because of the Prop 48 conditions, Aunese missed his first year of eligibility with the team in 1986.  He came into the 1987 season and soon took over the starting job at quarterback that same year;  he led the Buffaloes to a 7–4 record, but no postseason bowl game.  Aunese was awarded the Big Eight Newcomer of the Year award after the season. Colorado was 8–3 in the 1988 regular season, but lost to Brigham Young in the

Illness and death
During his participation in the Freedom Bowl, coaches, players, and family noticed that Aunese was not his usual self. Teammates told him he looked sluggish on the field and family members wished he would be taken out of the game.  In the months following the bowl game, Aunese experienced a multitude of symptoms, including coughing consistently, a loss of appetite, and vomiting blood, which caused him to miss many workouts and drills. 

Aunese was examined in March 1989 and doctors diagnosed him with a rare form of inoperable stomach cancer. He was given six months to live after his initial diagnosis.  Over the course of the next several months, Aunese continued to visit Colorado games and practices, but he continued to get weaker from the cancer and died at University Hospital in Denver on 

Aunese's memorial service was held in Boulder at Macky Auditorium on the university campus. It was filled to capacity with over 2,000 mourners, and hundreds more outside.  He was buried at Eternal Hills Memorial Park located in Oceanside, California. The football team dedicated the season to Aunese, customizing the team's jerseys with the name "Sal" sewn into their sleeves. They went 11–0 in the regular season, but lost to Notre Dame in the Orange Bowl. The Buffaloes did win the Orange Bowl rematch against Notre Dame by a point the following season, earning its only national championship – a title it shared with

Personal life
Aunese is the father of former LSU football player and Cleveland Browns assistant coach T. C. McCartney.

References

External links
ESPN: Full Circle – Sal Aunese & T.C. McCartney

1968 births
1989 deaths
American football quarterbacks
American sportspeople of Samoan descent
Colorado Buffaloes football players
Deaths from cancer in Colorado
Deaths from stomach cancer
People from Vista, California
Players of American football from California
Sportspeople from Oceanside, California
University of Colorado alumni